Hannelore Göttlich is a retired German rower who won six medals at the European championships between 1959 and 1964, five of them with Helga Richter. In December 1964, she was awarded the Medal of Merit of the GDR.

References

Year of birth missing (living people)
Living people
East German female rowers
Recipients of the Medal of Merit of the GDR
European Rowing Championships medalists